The 2011 Northern Colorado Bears football team represented the University of Northern Colorado in the 2011 NCAA Division I FCS football season. The Bears were led by first-year head coach Earnest Collins Jr. and played their home games at Nottingham Field. They are a member of the Big Sky Conference. They finished the season 0–11, 0–8 in Big Sky place to finish in last place. It was the school's first winless season since 1920.

Schedule

References

Northern Colorado
Northern Colorado Bears football seasons
College football winless seasons
Northern Colorado Bears football